Oleška  is a municipality and village in Prague-East District in the Central Bohemian Region of the Czech Republic. It has about 1,000 inhabitants.

Administrative parts
Villages of Brník, Bulánka, Králka and Krymlov are administrative parts of Oleška.

References

Villages in Prague-East District